Mario Bytyçi (born 22 February 1985) is a professional Albanian footballer who currently plays as a goalkeeper for KF Burreli in the Albanian First Division.

Goals scored
He is known for the most goalkeeper goals in Albania, ten in all: four at FC Kamza, two at KF Skrapari, one each at KF Butrinti and KF Adriatiku Mamurras and four for KF Bylis.

Honours
Pogradeci
 Albanian First Division (1): 2010–11

References

1985 births
Living people
Footballers from Tirana
Albanian footballers
Association football goalkeepers
Besa Kavajë players
FK Tomori Berat players
KF Skrapari players
KS Pogradeci players
FC Kamza players
KF Butrinti players
KF Adriatiku Mamurrasi players
KF Erzeni players
KF Bylis Ballsh players
Kategoria Superiore players
Kategoria e Parë players